The Upper Nicola Band (also spelt as Spaxomin) is a First Nations band government in the Canadian province of British Columbia, located near the town of Merritt in the Nicola Country at Douglas Lake.  They are a member of both the Okanagan Nation Alliance and the Scw’exmx Tribal Council, which is a joint government of Okanagan and Nlaka'pamux bands.

Indian Reserves

Indian Reserves under the administration of the band are:

 Nicola Lake 1, 2,699,10 Acres
 Hamilton Creek 2, 60 Acres
 Douglas Lake 3, 23,047.50 Acres
 Spahomin Creek 4, 32- Acres
 Chapperon Lake 5, 725.00 Acres
 Chapperon Creek 6, 15.1 Acres
 Salmon Lake 7, 172.00 Acres
 Spahomin Creek 8, 3,857.30 Acres
 Hihium Lake 6 (Shared between Upper Nicola, Lower Nicola, Bonaparte, and Tk’emlúps te Secwépemc Bands), 78 Acres

References

Syilx governments
Nicola Country